Clive St George Clement Stanbrook QC OBE (10 April 1948 – 13 April 2018) was a British barrister who defended mercenaries in Angola and Dr Hastings Banda in Malawi.

References

External links
Official website

1948 births
2018 deaths
British barristers
Alumni of University College London
Deaths from cholangiocarcinoma
People from Harrow, London